Vlčice is a municipality and village in Trutnov District in the Hradec Králové Region of the Czech Republic. It has about 600 inhabitants.

Administrative parts
Vlčice is made up of one administrative part. The territory includes the hamlet of Hrádeček.

Notable people
Václav Havel (1936–2011), playwright, President of the Czech Republic; lived and died in Hrádeček

References

Villages in Trutnov District